Dirck Wijntrack, or Wyntrack (1615, Heusden – 1678, The Hague), was a Dutch Golden Age painter.

Biography
According to the RKD he is known for landscapes and farm scenes with animals and worked with Jan Wijnants and Joris van der Haagen collaborating on landscape paintings.
He married in Rotterdam in 1646 and worked in Gouda during the years 1651-1655. He worked in Schoonhoven in the year 1655, and moved to The Hague in 1657 where he stayed.

He married a sister-in-law of Ludolph de Jongh (1616 - 1697) Painter, sheriff of Hillegersberg (since 1665).

References

Dirck Wijntrack on Artnet

1615 births
1678 deaths
Dutch Golden Age painters
Dutch male painters
People from Heusden